Developmental pluripotency-associated protein 2 is a protein that in humans is encoded by the DPPA2 gene.

References

Further reading